Bickham Escott (6 February 1800 – 4 November 1853) was a British Conservative Member of Parliament and, later, Radical politician.

After standing at a by-election in 1833 at Westminster, Escott was first elected Conservative MP for Winchester in 1841, and held the seat until the general election in 1847, when he was defeated. He then stood for Plymouth as a Radical at the 1852 general election, but was unsuccessful.

References

External links
 

Conservative Party (UK) MPs for English constituencies
UK MPs 1841–1847
1800 births
1853 deaths